Osabarimba Kwesi Atta II is a Ghanaian traditional ruler and the Omanhene of the Oguaa traditional area. He has served on many Government of Ghana agencies as board member.

References 

Living people
Ghanaian leaders
People from Central Region (Ghana)
Ghanaian royalty
Year of birth missing (living people)